What Do Artists Do All Day? is a documentary series, airing on BBC Four.  Film crews accompany various prominent artists as they go about their daily schedules and share insights into their working lives and creative processes.

Episodes
Series 1
2013-03-19 – Series 1 – 1. Norman Ackroyd, the working life of Britain's celebrated landscape artist.
2013-03-25 – Series 1 – 2. Polly Morgan, the taxidermist's strange and wonderful art
2013-04-08 – Series 1 – 3. Jack Vettriano, the popular artist at work in his studio.
2013-06-04 – Series 1 – 4. Cornelia Parker, prepares for a new exhibition of her work in London.
2013-08-22 – Series 1 – 5. John Byrne, artist and writer, completes a mural for King's Theatre in Edinburgh.
2013-11-06 – Series 1 – 6. Edmund de Waal, ceramic artist, author of the memoir The Hare with Amber Eyes
2013-11-13 – Series 1 – 7. Shani Rhys James, Welsh painter as she prepares for a new exhibition.
2014-02-25 – Series 1 – 8. Tom Wood, photographer at work in Mayo in the west of Ireland.
2014-03-04 – Series 1 – 9. Frank Quitely, alter ego of Glaswegian comic-book artist, Vince Deighan.
2014-03-13 – Series 1 – 10. Marvin Gaye Chetwynd, the performance artist's first solo UK show in Nottingham.
2014-03-11 – Series 1 – 11. Albert Watson photographs the landscape of the Isle of Skye.
2014-03-26 – Series 1 – 12. Antony Gormley and his team as they prepare a new work.
2014-05-19 – Series 1 – 13. Michael Craig-Martin at work in his London studio.
Series 2
2014-10-12 – Series 2 – 1. Evelyn Glennie, how the Dame became a global percussion superstar.
2014-10-15 – Series 2 – 2. Akram Khan, the creation of  TOROBAKA, the dance collaboration with Israel Galvan.
2014-10-22 – Series 2 – 4. Michael Landy as he takes his Art Bin project to Yokohama.
2014-11-05 – Series 2 – 5. Jake and Dinos Chapman as they prepare for a new show in Hastings.
Series 3
2015-06-08 – Series 3 – 1. Tracey Emin, in her studio, preparing for an exhibition in Vienna.
2015-06-15 – Series 3 – 2. Sue Webster, at work on new projects, including a cook book.
2015-08-24 – Series 3 – 3. Derek Boshier works on a new painting and reflects on his life.
2015-08-26 – Series 3 – 4. Peter Blake, following the process of his latest work.
Series 4
Dennis Morris
Katie Paterson
Shirley Hughes
Series 5
Anoushka Shankar
Raqib Shaw
Mahtab Hussain

References

External links
 
 
 BBC Four – What Do Artists Do All Day?
 What Do Artists Do All Day? – Radio Times

2010s British documentary television series
Documentary television series about art
2013 British television series debuts
2015 British television series endings
BBC television documentaries
British art